The Saint Louis University School of Social Work is established in 1930 and continually accredited since 1933, the school offers students and faculty an opportunity to follow the Jesuit tradition of being "women and men for others."

Rankings and accreditation

SLU's School of Social Work is fully accredited by the Council on Social Work Education (CSWE) – a recognition it has held since 1952.

U.S. News & World Report ranks the school among the top 25% in the nation.

Degrees and programs

SLU's School of Social Work offers two undergraduate degrees, three master's, six dual-degree master's, one PhD, and two certificates.

Location and facilities
Saint Louis University's School of Social Work is located in Tegeler Hall, on the main Frost Campus in midtown St. Louis, Missouri.

References

Saint Louis University
Schools of social work in the United States
Educational institutions established in 1930
1930 establishments in Missouri
Jesuit development centres
Poverty-related organizations
Non-profit organizations based in the United States
Community-building organizations
Social welfare charities based in the United States
Development studies
Research institutes in Missouri